Trimalchio is a character in the 1st-century AD Roman work of fiction Satyricon by Petronius. He features as the ostentatious, nouveau-riche host in the section titled the "Cēna Trīmalchiōnis" (The Banquet of Trimalchio, often translated as "Dinner with Trimalchio"). Trimalchio is an arrogant former slave who has become quite wealthy as a wine merchant. The name "Trimalchio" is formed from the Greek prefix τρις and the Semitic מלך (melech) in its occidental form Malchio or Malchus. The fundamental meaning of the root is "King", and the name "Trimalchio" would thus mean "Thrice King" or "greatest King".

Character description

His full name is "Gaius Pompeius Trimalchio Maecenatianus"; the references to Pompey and Maecenas in his name serve to enhance his ostentatious character. His wife's name is Fortunata, a former slave and chorus girl. Trimalchio is known for throwing lavish dinner parties, where his numerous slaves bring course after course of exotic delicacies, such as live birds sewn up inside a pig, live birds inside fake eggs which the guests have to "collect" themselves, and a dish to represent every sign of the zodiac.

The Satyricon has a lengthy description of Trimalchio's proposed tomb (71–72), which is ostentatious and lavish. By the end of the banquet, Trimalchio's drunken showiness leads to the entire household acting out his funeral, all for his own amusement and egotism.

Cultural references
The term "Trimalchio" has become shorthand for the worst excesses of the nouveau riche.

 Trimalchio is referred to in the novel Pompeii by Robert Harris, where the character Numerius Popidius Ampliatus, also a freed slave who has become wealthy, throws a great, but ghastly, dinner party where there is too much for everyone to eat. One of the magistrates present for the banquet, Quintus Brittius, secretly mouths the word Tri-mal-chio to Ampliatus's former master, Lucius Popidius Secundus, one of the aediles of Pompeii, to their greater amusement.
 There is a single mention of Trimalchio in F. Scott Fitzgerald's The Great Gatsby as his showy parties and background parallel those of Gatsby: Chapter 7 begins, "It was when curiosity about Gatsby was at its highest that the lights in his house failed to go on one Saturday night – and, as obscurely as it began, his career as Trimalchio was over." Trimalchio and Trimalchio in West Egg were among Fitzgerald's working titles for the novel. In the 2013 movie based on the novel, the orchestra leader at Gatsby's mansion is named Trimalchio (played by Iota).
 Trimalchio's feast is alluded to in the short story "Toga Party" by John Barth, which was included in The Best American Short Stories 2007, in reference to Tom and Patsy Hardison's lavish toga party.
 Trimalchio and his feast are referenced in Octavio Paz's poem, "I Speak of the City".
 Thomas Love Peacock mentions Trimalchio and Niceros in his preface to Rhododaphne (1818).
 Albert Pike in the "Entered Apprentice" chapter of his Scottish Rite Freemasonry text Morals & Dogma (1871) references Trimalchio as an example of a legislator who spends the public purse lavishly or extravagantly – operating from their own vices and egotism. He counsels Scottish Rite Freemasons to stand against such lawmakers.
 In The Triumph of Love by Geoffrey Hill (1998), Trimalchio appears throughout the poem as one of its many personae.
 On Finnish band Apollo's 1970 eponymous album is a song called "Trimalcion", composed by jazz-drummer Edward Vesala, one of his first released compositions
 C. P. Snow references Trimalchio in Chapter 28 of In Their Wisdom (1974).  The self-made magnate Swaffield hosts a party in order to restore favour with influential figures within the Conservative party, “…he acted as though giving a Cabinet Minister a good dinner was likely to make him a friend for life.  Would it have been better, sceptics could have pondered, to avoid the ghost of Trimalchio and give that Cabinet Minister a cheese sandwich at the local pub?”.  The party was held on Thursday 20 July 1972 at 27 Hill Street, W1, “There were, though, considerable departures from Trimalchio about the July party.  It had to be stately, Swaffield decided before he got down to planning…”.
DBC Pierre's novel Lights Out in Wonderland climaxes with a dinner party closely modeled on that of Trimalchio.
Robin Brooks refers to Trimalchio in The Portland Vase, recounting the tale of a glass maker who claimed to have made unbreakable glass. On demonstrating this and confirming he had not shared the production method, the craftsman was beheaded to protect Roman Industry.
 Cormac McCarthy’s novel The Passenger has the Falstaffian character John Sheddan state to the protagonist Bobby Western, “Trimalchio  is wiser than Hamlet” to summarise his discourse on the condition of modern man.

Notes

Further reading
 Bagnani, G. "Trimalchio." Phoenix 8, no. 3 (1954): 77–91. 
 Baldwin, B. "Trimalchios's Domestic Staff." Acta Classica 21 (1978): 87–97.
 Bodel, J. "The Cena Trimalchionis." Latin Fiction. Ed. Heinz Hofmann. London: Taylor and Francis, 1999, 38–51.
 Frangoulidis, S. "Trimalchio as Narrator and Stage Director in the Cena: An Unobserved Parallelism in Petronius’ Satyricon 78." Classical Philology 103, no. 1 (2008): 81–87. 
 MacKendrick, P. L. "The Great Gatsby and Trimalchio." The Classical Journal 45, no. 7 (1950): 307–14. 
 Newton, R. M. "Trimalchio's Hellish Bath". The Classical Journal 77, no. 4 (1982): 315–19.
 Petersen, L. H. The Freedman in Roman Art and Art History. Cambridge: Cambridge University Press, 2006.
 Ramsby, T. "'Reading' the Freed Slave in the Cena Trimalchionis". Free At Last!: The Impact of Freed Slaves on the Roman Empire. Ed. Sinclair Bell and Teresa Ramsby. London: Bloomsbury Academic, 2012. 66–87. 
 Schmeling, G. "Trimalchio's Menu and Wine List." Classical Philology 65, no. 4 (1970): 248–51. 
 Slater, W. J. (ed.), Dining in a Classical Context. (Ann Arbor, 1991).
 Ypsilanti, M. "Trimalchio and Fortunata as Zeus and Hera: Quarrel in theCena and Iliad. Harvard Studies in Classical Philology 105 (2010): 221–37.

External links

 Trimalchio's Dinner, Satyricon, Sections 26-78 at Perseus Digital Library

Fictional ancient Romans
Fictional Greek and Roman slaves
Satyricon